Fabrisio Saïdy (born 15 July 1999) is a French sprinter specialising in the 400 metres. He won a bronze medal in the 4 × 400 metres relay at the 2019 European Indoor Championships.

International competitions

Personal bests
Outdoor
200 metres – 21.71 (-1.7 m/s, L'Étang-Salé 2017)
400 metres – 46.91 (Saint-Denis de la Réunion 2018)
Indoor
400 metres – 46.67 (Miramas 2019)

References

External links
 

1999 births
Living people
French male sprinters